Hustling is a 1975 American television film directed by Joseph Sargent based on a book about prostitution by Gail Sheehy. The film stars Jill Clayburgh as "Redpants", alongside Lee Remick, while its script is written by Fay Kanin.

Cast
Lee Remick
Monte Markham
Jill Clayburgh
Alex Rocco
Melanie Mayron
Burt Young
Beverly Hope Atkinson
Howard Hesseman

Reception
Jill Clayburgh credited the film as important in her career. "It changed my career,” Clayburgh said. “It was a part that I did well, and suddenly people wanted me. Sidney Furie saw me, and wanted me for Gable and Lombard." Her performance in the TV film eventually earned her an Emmy nomination.

References

External links
Hustling at IMDb
Hustling at TCMDB
Hustling at Letterbox DVD

1975 television films
1975 films